XS may refer to:

Arts and entertainment
 XS (comics), a DC Comics superheroine
 XS (manhwa), a South Korean comic by Song Ji-Hyung
 XS (radio station), a defunct station in Neath Port Talbot, Wales
 "XS" (song), a 2020 song by Rina Sawayama
 XS (video game), a 1997 FPS game made by GT interactive
 Xiaolin Showdown, an American animated television series
 XS: The Opera Opus (1984-6) no wave opera

Science, technology, and mathematics
 XS (Perl), an interface through which computer programs written in Perl can call C language subroutines
 Yamaha Motif, a series of synthesizers
 XS (EVS), a production server of EVS Broadcast Equipment
 Para-Ski XS, a Canadian powered parachute design
 Cross section (geometry)
 iPhone XS, smartphone by Apple Inc.

Other uses
 XS Energy Drink, drinks produced by AMWAY
 XS, a nightclub at the Encore Las Vegas
 Xavier School, a secondary school in San Juan, Metro Manila, Philippines
 Extra Small (XS), a size of clothing

See also
Excess (disambiguation)